Chaplain (Rear Admiral) Robert Francis Burt, USN, (March 1, 1948 – January 27, 2014) was an American Navy officer who served as the 24th Chief of Chaplains of the United States Navy from 2006 to 2010.

Early career and education
Burt joined the United States Navy in 1970, where he served aboard the  after completing boot camp at the Naval Training Center Orlando, Florida. He finished his enlisted service in 1977. Afterwards, he obtained a bachelor's degree at  Eugene Bible College and became a minister of the Open Bible Standard Churches.

Decorations
Admiral Burt received the Legion of Merit, the Meritorious Service Medal (three awards), Navy Commendation Medal (two awards) and various service and campaign awards. He died in 2014 from multiple myeloma and is buried at Tahoma National Cemetery.

References

External links

2014 deaths
Deaths from multiple myeloma
People from Springfield, Oregon
Recipients of the Legion of Merit
Chiefs of Chaplains of the United States Navy
United States Navy rear admirals (upper half)
1948 births
Chaplains of the United States Marine Corps
People from Silverdale, Washington
Burials at Tahoma National Cemetery
Military personnel from Oregon